Aryeh Leon Kubowitzki (2 November 1896 – 16 May 1966) was Israeli lawyer and diplomat.

Early life 
Aryeh Leon Kubowitzki was born on 2 November 1896 in Kuršėnai, Russian Empire.

Career

World Jewish Congress 
Kubowitzki was one of the founders of the World Jewish Congress (WJC) in August 1936.

On 1 July 1944 Kubowitzki wrote to John W. Pehle opposing proposals to conduct aerial bombardment of the extermination camps on the grounds that "the first victims would be the Jews". Kubowitzki instead proposed that Soviet paratroopers and members of the Polish resistance be instructed to attack the installations.

He served as the Secretary-General of the WJC from 1945 to 1948.

Diplomat 
Kubowitzki made aliyah in 1948.

Kubowitzki served as the Israeli ambassador to Czechoslovakia, Poland, and several South American countries.

Retirement and death 
Kubowitzki died on 16 May 1966 in Jerusalem, Israel.

Personal life 
Kubowitzki was married to Myriam Goldstein-Kubovy (1897-1992).

References 

1896 births
1966 deaths
People from Kuršėnai
Israeli diplomats